Paice is a Baltimore headquartered hybrid technology company. It holds numerous patents in this field of technology. The company develops transitory technology for gas-driven and electricity-driven vehicles. Paice also has numerous patent conflicts with larger companies.

Company 
Paice developed early hybrid-electric powertrain concepts for passenger vehicles in the 1990s. Paice developed 'Hyperdrive'. The founder is Alex Severinsky, a Russian emigrant, 1992.  In recent years, Paice LLC has been controlled by the Abell Foundation and has focused on patent litigation. Paice has sued Toyota, Ford, and most recently Hyundai for allegedly infringing on its patents.

Field of Operation 
Paice develops hybrid technologies for automotive use. Technologies developed by Paice are applied in various vehicles such as the Toyota Prius, Ford C-MAX and Porsche Cayenne E-Hybrid. Besides development marketing, the company also focuses on defending its patents.

Patents 
Paice holds about 29 patents in the field of hybrid vehicle drivetrain.

Core patents are:
 Paice US patent 6.209.672, Hybrid car with two electric motors, one connected to engine and one connected to car wheels, from 1998
 Paice US-Patent 5.343.970, Improved hybrid electric vehicle where both engine and electric motor power the car, and energy is captured via regenerative braking, from 1992 and 
 Paice US patent 6.338.391, Electric motor coupled to turbocharged motor, and control system dating from 1999 as basic patents.

Patent Conflicts 
The company has patent conflicts with Hyundai because of its Hyundai Sonata Hybrid, and Kia, because of its Kia Optima hybrid car. Millions of dollars of compensation have been successfully claimed. 
Similar claims against Ford in 7 of 25 patent appeals by Ford ended up in final decisions by the US patent office USPTAB in favor of Paice. Further decisions are in progress.
 

Some claims though were lost.

Paice's claims were backed by the Abell Foundation, a risk capital partner. 

In 2016 Paice said that VW, Audi and Porsche used Paice patented technology infringing Paice's patents.

 This dispute was settled in early 2017; the terms of the settlement are confidential.

See also 
 Hybrid electric vehicle
 Hybrid vehicle drivetrain

References

External links 
 Automotive News - Patent 'trolls' target automakers, and Ford pushes back

Manufacturing companies based in Baltimore
Hybrid electric cars
Partial zero-emissions vehicles
Hybrid powertrain